Nordhordland is a newspaper published in Knarvik, Norway, and covers the district of Nordhordland. Its main competitor is Strilen, which is also published in Knarvik and covers Nordhordland.

External links
 Official site

Newspapers published in Norway
Nordhordland